Marie-Josèphe Yoyotte (5 November 1929 – 17 July 2017) was a French film and television editor and actress. Her extensive editing credits include The 400 Blows, Winged Migration and Microcosmos, the latter of which garnered Yoyotte a César Award for Best Editing.

Filmography

References

External links

1929 births
2017 deaths
French film editors
César Award winners
People from Lyon Metropolis
French women film editors